The 1950 World Table Tennis Championships women's doubles was the 16th edition of the women's doubles championship.
Dora Beregi and Helen Elliot defeated Gizi Farkas and Angelica Rozeanu in the final by three sets to one.

Results

See also
List of World Table Tennis Championships medalists

References

-
1950 in women's table tennis